Dialectica rendalli is a moth of the family Gracillariidae. It is known from Jamaica, Puerto Rico and the Virgin Islands (Saint Croix and Saint Thomas).

The larvae feed on Hibiscus rosa-sinensis. They probably mine the leaves of their host plant.

References

Dialectica (moth)
Moths described in 1897